Musique Mecanique is an album by American composer, bandleader and keyboardist Carla Bley recorded in 1978 and released on the Watt/ECM label in 1979.

Reception
The AllMusic review by Scott Yanow awarded the album 4 stars and stated "Carla Bley's tentet performs some of her most colorful themes on this often-humorous and generally stimulating set". The Penguin Guide to Jazz awarded the album 3 stars. Robert Christgau commented, "I'm still attracted to Bley's humor, best displayed here in the title piece, a wry take on the charms and imperfections of the mechanical mode. But this is basically desultory, hinting at the feckless formalism an obsession with textures so often conceals. Beyond the jokes, and the deliberately aborted moments of lyricism, she really doesn't have much to say. Weill sure did. And so did Satie."

Track listing
All compositions by Carla Bley.
 "440" - 9:48  
 "Jesus Maria and Other Spanish Strains" - 11:54  
 "Musique Mecanique I" - 9:46  
 "Musique Mecanique II (At Midnight)" - 7:02  
 "Musique Mecanique III" - 6:28

Personnel
Carla Bley - organ, piano (track 2), toy piano (track 3)
Michael Mantler - trumpet  
Alan Braufman - alto saxophone, clarinet, flute  
Gary Windo - tenor saxophone, bass clarinet, vocal
John Clark - french horn
Roswell Rudd - trombone, vocal on "Musique Mecanique II (At Midnight)"
Bob Stewart - tuba  
Terry Adams - piano, electric pump organ 
Steve Swallow - bass guitar  
D. Sharpe - drums
Charlie Haden - acoustic bass (track 2)  
Eugene Chadbourne - acoustic guitar, electric guitar, walkie-talkie (track 2)  
Karen Mantler - glockenspiel

References

ECM Records albums
Carla Bley albums
1979 albums